Tokhtuyeva is a rural locality (a selo) and the administrative center of Tokhtuyevskoye Rural Settlement, Solikamsky District, Perm Krai, Russia. The population was 1,583 as of 2010. There are 62 streets.

Geography 
Tokhtuyeva is located 9 km north of Solikamsk (the district's administrative centre) by road. Syola is the nearest rural locality.

References 

Rural localities in Solikamsky District